is a Japanese speed skater. She was born in Hokkaido. She competed at the 2014 Winter Olympics in Sochi, where she placed 15th in the 3000 meters and 10th in the 5000 meters.

References

External links

1987 births
Japanese female speed skaters
Speed skaters at the 2014 Winter Olympics
Olympic speed skaters of Japan
Sportspeople from Hokkaido
Living people
Universiade medalists in speed skating
Universiade bronze medalists for Japan
Speed skaters at the 2007 Winter Universiade
Medalists at the 2007 Winter Universiade
21st-century Japanese women